The vault or vault cytoplasmic ribonucleoprotein is a eukaryotic organelle whose function is not yet fully understood. Discovered and isolated by Nancy Kedersha and Leonard Rome in 1986, vaults are cytoplasmic organelles which, when negative-stained and viewed under an electron microscope, resemble the arches of a cathedral's vaulted ceiling, with 39-fold (or D39d) symmetry. They are present in many types of eukaryotic cells, and appear to be highly conserved among eukaryotes.

Morphology 
Vaults are large ribonucleoprotein particles. About 3 times the size of a ribosome and weighing approximately 13 MDa, they are found in most eukaryotic cells and all higher eukaryotes. They measure 34 nm by 60 nm from a negative stain, 26 nm by 49 nm from cryo-electron microscopy, and 35 nm by 59 nm from STEM.  The vaults consist primarily of proteins, making it difficult to stain with conventional techniques.

Structure 
The protein structure consists of an outer shell composed of 78 copies of the ~100 kDa major vault protein (MVP). Inside are two associated vault proteins, TEP1 and VPARP. TEP1, also known as the telomerase-associated protein 1, is 290 kDa and VPARP (also known as PARP4) is related to poly (ADP-ribose) polymerase (PARP) and is 193 kDa. Vaults from higher eukaryotes also contain one or several small vault RNAs (vRNAs, also known as vtRNAs) of 86–141 bases within.

The MVP subunits are composed head-to-head, with the N-termini of each half-vault facing each other. From the N-terminal to the C-terminal, a MVP subunit folds into 9 repeat domains, 1 band7-like shoulder domain, 1 cap-helix domain, and 1 cap-ring domain, corresponding to the shape of the vault shell. VPARP is located at repeat domain #4. TEP1, itself a ring due to the WD40 repeat, binds to the cap domain, with one particular type of vRNA plugging the cap.

Function 
Despite not being fully elucidated, vaults have been associated with the nuclear pore complexes and their octagonal shape appears to support this.  Vaults have been implicated in a broad range of cellular functions including nuclear-cytoplasmic transport, mRNA localization, drug resistance, cell signaling, nuclear pore assembly, and innate immunity. The three vault proteins (MVP, VPARP, and TEP1) have each been knocked out individually and in combination (VPARP and TEP1) in mice. All of the knockout mice are viable and no major phenotypic alterations have been observed. Dictyostelium encode three different MVPs, two of which have been knocked out singly and in combination. The only phenotype seen in the Dictyostelium double knockout was growth retardation under nutritional stress. If vaults are involved in essential cellular functions, it seems likely that redundant systems exist that can ameliorate their loss.

Association with cancer 
In the late 1990s, researchers found that vaults (especially the MVP) were over-expressed in cancer patients who were diagnosed with multidrug resistance, that is the resistance against many chemotherapy treatments.  Although this does not prove that increased number of vaults led to drug resistance, it does hint at some sort of involvement.  This has potential in discovering the mechanisms behind drug-resistance in tumor cells and improving anticancer drugs.

Evolutionary conservation 
Vaults have been identified in mammals, amphibians, avians and Dictyostelium discoideum. The Vault model used by the Pfam database identifies homologues in Paramecium tetraurelia, Kinetoplastida, many vertebrates, a cnidarian (starlet sea anemone), molluscs, Trichoplax adhaerens, flatworms, Echinococcus granulosus and  Choanoflagellate.

Although vaults have been observed in many eukaryotic species, a few species do not appear to have the ribonucleoprotein. These include:
Arabidopsis thaliana—a small flowering plant related to cabbage and mustard.
Caenorhabditis elegans—a free-living nematode that lives in soil.
Drosophila melanogaster—a two-winged insect also known as a fruit fly.
Saccharomyces cerevisiae—a species of yeast.

These four species are model organisms for plants, nematodes, animal genetics and fungi respectively. Despite these exceptions, the high degree of similarity of vaults in organisms that do have them implies some sort of evolutionary importance.

Homologs of the major vault protein has been computationally found in bacteria. Cyanobacterial sequences appear most similar. Pfam is also able to identify some such homologs.

Vault engineering 
The Rome lab at UCLA has collaborated with a number of groups to use the baculovirus system to produce large quantities of vaults. When the major vault protein (MVP) is expressed in insect cells, vault particles are assembled on polyribosomes in the cytoplasm. By using molecular genetic techniques to modify the gene encoding the major vault protein, vault particles have been produced with chemically active peptides attached to their sequence. These modified proteins are incorporated into the inside of the vault particle without altering its basic structure. Proteins and peptides can also be packaged into vaults by attachment of a packaging domain derived from the VPARP protein. A number of modified vault particles have been produced in order to test the concept that vaults can be bio-engineered to allow their use in a wide variety of biological applications including drug delivery, biological sensors, enzyme delivery, controlled release, and environmental remediation.

A vault has been packaged with a chemokine for potential use to activate the immune system to attack lung cancer, and this approach has undergone phase I trials.

See also 
 Vault RNA
 Major vault protein

References

External links 
 Vault website (UCLA). — Web archive (28 Feb. 2009)
 
 
 Major vault protein on Proteopedia

Ribonucleoproteins
Organelles